Fabio Mosquera (born 28 November 1947) is a Colombian footballer. He competed in the men's tournament at the 1968 Summer Olympics.

References

External links

1947 births
Living people
Colombian footballers
Colombia international footballers
Olympic footballers of Colombia
Footballers at the 1968 Summer Olympics
Footballers from Cali
Association football forwards
Deportivo Cali footballers